Paul Carmichael is an English bass guitarist and composer.

Career 
In his early 20s, Carmichael joined the jazz-rock band Nucleus to play on tour in Germany. He has also toured with Soft Machine and Barbara Thompson's Paraphernalia. In the 1980s he was in the house band for the children's TV show Play Away.

In 1979, he joined the guitarist Allan Holdsworth in the group I.O.U. and recorded the critically acclaimed album I.O.U..

In 2011, he released the album Wax is Melting which features the Incognito vocalist Vanessa Haynes.

Discography
 Wax is Melting (2011) featuring Vanessa Haynes
 In the Distance (2011)

With Allan Holdsworth
 I.O.U. (1982)

With Gary Husband
 What It Is (Live in the studio circa 1980) (1998)

With Steve Topping
 Time and Distance (1997)

References

External links
 
 
 
 Official site

Living people
English bass guitarists
British male jazz musicians
English jazz guitarists
Jazz-rock guitarists
Jazz fusion bass guitarists
British world music musicians
21st-century British male musicians
Year of birth missing (living people)